This article lists the results for the Japan national football team between 1950 and 1959.

1951

1954

1955

1956

1958

1959

References

Japan national football team results
1950s in Japanese sport